Giovanni Guidiccioni (1480 in Lucca – 1541 in Macerata) was an Italian poet and a Catholic bishop of Fossombrone.

Biography
Born at Lucca in 1480, Guidiccioni was a nephew of Bartolomeo Guidiccioni and eventually occupied a high position, being the bishop of Fossombrone and president of Romagna. The latter office nearly cost him his life; a murderer attempted to kill him, and had already touched his breast with his dagger when, conquered by the resolute calmness of the prelate, he threw away the weapon and fell at Guidiccioni's feet, asking for forgiveness.

The Rime and Letters of Guidiccioni are models of elegant and natural Italian style. His best-known work, though usually wrongly attributed to others, was the text to the madrigal Il bianco e dolce cigno by Jacques Arcadelt.

References 

 

1480 births
1541 deaths
Italian Renaissance writers
Italian poets
Italian male poets
Musicians from Lucca